Stanton A. Waterman (born April 5, 1923) is a five-time Emmy winning cinematographer and underwater film producer.

Career 
Waterman first obtained a hand-made Japanese diving mask in the early 1930s, long before they were being made in the West or in common circulation. He first used it as a boy at Palm Beach, Florida.

After returning home from service in the US Navy during World War II, he became the first resident of Maine to purchase an aqualung, designed by Jacques Cousteau.

Waterman graduated from Dartmouth College, where he studied with Robert Frost, in 1946 with a degree in English. He began his SCUBA diving career in the Bahamas where he owned and operated a diving charter business from 1954 until 1958. His big break came in 1965 when he filmed a year-long family trip to Tahiti. National Geographic purchased the rights to the work and showed it on television. He was a producer and photographer on the 1971 film Blue Water, White Death which was the first cinematic filming of the great white shark.

Waterman was the subject of a Discovery Channel biographical special titled The Man Who Loves Sharks.  Working with his son, he won the first father and son Emmy for the National Geographic Explorer production Dancing With Stingrays.

Television credits include The American Sportsman (1965), The Bermuda Depths (1978), and The Explorers (1973) and film credits include The Deep (1977) and Jaws of Death (1977).

He won five Emmy awards for his work on underwater films and TV programs.

In 2005 Waterman wrote Sea Salt: Memories and Essays, with forewords by Peter Benchley and Howard Hall. He also wrote essays for Ocean Realm magazine.

In 2013, Waterman took his last dive in the Cayman Islands at the age of 90.

See also

References

External links
 interview in *Gilliam, Bret C (2007). Diving Pioneers and Innovators. New World Publications. .

1923 births
Living people
American underwater divers
Dartmouth College alumni
Place of birth missing (living people)
Underwater photographers
Emmy Award winners
Underwater filmmakers
United States Navy personnel of World War II